Hairy sedge is a common name for the plant Carex hirta, native to Europe.

Hairy sedge may also refer to:

Carex comans, native to New Zealand
Carex hirta, native to Europe
Carex hirtifolia, native to north-eastern North America
Carex lacustris, native to North America
Carex pilosa, native to temperate Eurasia